Haralds Sīmanis (12 June 1951 – 1 December 2022) was a Latvian singer and composer.

Biography
Sīmanis was born in Cēsis to a mixed Latvian-Romani family. He did not receive a muscial education but learned to play guitar and organ. In the 1970s, he began collaborating with poet , whose poems he used for many of his songs, such as the organ pieces Mīlestība nekad nebeidzas, Likteņa lietavas, and Par zāli, sāli un Tevi.

Sīmanis gained notoriety in 1980 when he performed the ballad Ezers at that year's Mikrofona aptauja. In 1981, the play Sieviete ārpus mīlestības un nāves was staged at the Valmiera Drama Theatre, during which his songs were played.

In 2012, he performed the song Ezers alongside Agita Gabranova on the Latvijas Neatkarīgā Televīzija show Latvijas Zelta talanti.

Haralds Sīmanis died on 1 December 2022, at the age of 71.

Discography
Es strauta malā slāpēs eju bojā (1994)
Starp divām gaismām (1996)
Tavā vārdā (2000)
Starp divām gaismām (2006)
Es esmu rīts (2012)
Par zāli, par sāli un Tevi (2013)
Pasaka par atslēdziņu (2014)
Pa apli (2021)

References

External Lniks
 
 

1951 births
2022 deaths
Latvian singers
People from Cēsis